Ceradenia melanopus is a species of grammitid fern. It is endemic to Ecuador.  Its natural habitat is subtropical or tropical moist montane forests. It is threatened by habitat loss.

References

Polypodiaceae
Ferns of Ecuador
Endemic flora of Ecuador
Ferns of the Americas
Vulnerable flora of South America
Taxonomy articles created by Polbot